Israel Wijnschenk (24 November 1895 – 31 January 1943) was a Dutch gymnast. He competed in seven events at the 1928 Summer Olympics. He was killed in the Auschwitz concentration camp during World War II.

References

External links
 

1895 births
1943 deaths
Dutch male artistic gymnasts
Olympic gymnasts of the Netherlands
Gymnasts at the 1928 Summer Olympics
Gymnasts from Amsterdam
Dutch people who died in Auschwitz concentration camp
Dutch Jews who died in the Holocaust